Giulio Ricci (died 1592) was a Roman Catholic prelate who served as Bishop of Teramo (1581–1592),
Bishop of Gravina di Puglia (1575–1581),
and Bishop of Muro Lucano (1572–1575).

Biography
On 23 Jan 1572, Giulio Ricci was appointed during the papacy of Pope Pius V as Bishop of Muro Lucano.
On 9 May 1575, he was appointed during the papacy of Pope Gregory XIII as Bishop of Gravina di Puglia.
On 13 Nov 1581, he was appointed during the papacy of Pope Gregory XIII as Bishop of Teramo.
He served as Bishop of Teramo until his death on 3 Jul 1592.

Episcopal succession
While bishop, he was the principal co-consecrator of:
Antonio Migliori, Bishop of San Marco (1586);
Domenico Ginnasi, Archbishop of Manfredonia (1586);
Orazio Marzani, Bishop of San Severino (1586); and
Rutilio Benzoni, Bishop of Loreto (1586).

References

External links and additional sources
 (for Chronology of Bishops) 
 (for Chronology of Bishops) 
 (for Chronology of Bishops) 
 (for Chronology of Bishops) 
 (for Chronology of Bishops) 
 (for Chronology of Bishops) 

16th-century Italian Roman Catholic bishops
Bishops appointed by Pope Pius V
Bishops appointed by Pope Gregory XIII
1592 deaths